The Kingdom of Dhor was a petty kingdom in the confederation of 24 states known as Chaubisi Rajya. Dhor was annexed by the Kingdom of Nepal after their king supported the King of Parbat.

References 

Chaubisi Rajya
Dhor
Dhor
History of Nepal
Dhor